For real estate ownership, fractional financing takes two forms: traditional timeshare ownership and larger share fractional ownership.

Fractional mortgages for shares of 1/26 ownership or 2 weeks or fewer are considered timeshare financing, and is often provided initially by the project developers. Larger shares of ownership is generally considered fractional ownership and is typically in shares of 1/2, 1/4, 1/6, 1/8, 1/10, 1/12, 1/20.

Fractional financing is more difficult for most lenders since there is a small market for these loans, and no established secondary market for vacation finance mortgages of these types. Several companies make loans for fractional homes, yachts, planes and other properties.

References

Mortgage